Tenney may refer to:

People
 Anne Tenney, actress
 Asa Wentworth Tenney, federal judge
 Charles Daniel Tenney, American educator and diplomat to China
 Charles H. Tenney, "City Father" in Methuen, Massachusetts; hat merchant and banker, New York City
 Charles Henry Tenney, federal judge
 Claudia Tenney, United States Representative from New York
 Del Tenney (1930–2013), American film director
 Frank Tenney Johnson, painter of American west
 Fred Tenney (1871–1952), American baseball player
 Fred Tenney (outfielder) (1859–1919), American baseball player
 Helen Tenney, American spy for the Soviet Union in the 1930s and 1940s
 Horace A. Tenney, American politician
 Jack Tenney (politician), American politician and composer
 James Tenney, American composer and music theorist
 Jon Tenney, American actor
 Kevin S. Tenney, film director, screenwriter
 Merrill C. Tenney (1904–1985), professor of New Testament and Greek
 Mesh Tenney, American Thoroughbred horse trainer
 Robin Tenney (born 1958), American tennis player
 Samuel Tenney, United States Representative from New Hampshire
 Tabitha Gilman Tenney, author (1762–1837)
 Tommy Tenney, American preacher and author
 Turner Tenney (born 1998), American eSports player and streamer
 William Jewett Tenney, American author, editor

Places

United States
 Tenney, Minnesota, an unincorporated community in western Minnesota
 Tenney Mountain, near Plymouth, New Hampshire
 Tenney Castle Gatehouse, in Methuen, Massachusetts, and on the National Register of Historic Places
 Tenney Fire Hall, Tenney, Minnesota, placed on the National Register of Historic Places, but burnt to the ground in 2010
 Tenney Homestead, Stow, Massachusetts, on the National Register of Historic Places
 Tenney House and Groveland Hotel, Federal Point, Florida, on the National Register of Historic Places
 Tenney Stadium, a multi-purpose facility at Leonidoff Field, Poughkeepsie, New York

Antarctica
 Mount Tenney